Kibbanahalli is a village in the Tiptur taluk of Tumkur district in Karnataka state, India.
Kibbanahalli is a pre-historic site. Archaeologists believe that this site along with Biligere belong to the Early stone age. Hand-axe, guillotine chisels and many other Palaeolithic specimens found in the region are kept in the museum of the Geology Department of the Central College, Bangalore.

Transport
Kibbanahalli is well connected by road and railway network. It is 20 km from Taluk Headquarters Tiptur and nearest major rail head is in District Headquarters Tumkur.

See also
Hagalavadi
Tumkur
Mysore

References

Villages in Tumkur district